A list of films produced in Argentina in 1983:

1983

External links
 Argentine films of 1983 at the Internet Movie Database

1983
Argentine
Films